The 2020–21 SEHA League was the 10th season of the SEHA (South East Handball Association) League and seventh under the sponsorship of the Russian oil and gas company Gazprom. Ten teams from seven countries (Belarus, Croatia, Hungary, North Macedonia, Serbia, Slovakia and Ukraine participated in this year's competition.

Competition format
The competition begins with a group stage featuring 10 teams divided in two groups. Matches are played in a double round-robin system with home-and-away fixtures. In Groups A and B, the top two teams qualify for the quarterfinals, with teams ranked 3rd and 4th entering the playoffs. After conducted analysis and due to occasions occurred by global COVID-19 pandemic, along with correlation of European calendar issues, on 14 December 2020 in a meeting, the SEHA–Gazprom League Executive Committee has decided that, two clubs, Telekom Veszprém (2019/20 winner) and Meshkov Brest (COVID-19 issues) will be directly included in the quarterfinals and will not play in the Group phase.

Play-offs
In the play-offs, teams ranked 3rd and 4th in Group A and B are paired against each other in two-legged home-and-away matches. The two aggregate winners of the playoffs will advance to the quarter-finals joining the top-two teams of Groups A and B and Telekom Veszprém and Meshkov Brest who will directly play in the quarter-finals.

Quarter-finals
The two winners of the matches in the play-off phase, joined by the top two of Groups A and B, and Telekom Veszprém and Meshkov Brest, who are playing directly in the quarter-finals will play in home and away for the right to contest the SEHA Final 4.

SEHA Final 4
The culmination of the season, the SEHA Final 4, continues in its existing format, with the four top teams from the competition competing for the title over one weekend.

Team information
The SEHA – Gazprom League Executive Committee made a decision that 10 participants will play in this season.

Venues and locations

Group phase
In the group phase, each team played six matches within their respective groups. Three matches were played at home, and three matches away. The final position after the six rounds determined if a club will play in the play-off phase or if they will earn a direct placement to the quarter-finals phase.

Group A

Group B

Playoffs
The Play off phase was made up of two matches for each participating team, one match played at home and one match played away. The teams that finished the Group Phase in positions 3–4 played in the Play-off phase.

|}

Quarter-finals
There will be eight teams competing in the quarter-finals phase. Four teams will have earned a direct placement after the Group Phase, two teams, Telekom Veszprém and Meshkov Brest, directly played in quarter-finals due to COVID-19 pandemic and two additional teams will have earned a quarter-finals spot through the playoff phase.

The matches will be played between 21 and 26 August 2021 (first leg) and 26 and 31 August 2021 (second leg).

|}

Final Four
The four winners of the quarter-final matches qualify for the right to contest the SEHA final four. 
The Final Four will be played between 3 and 5 September 2021.

Due to the fact that the health authorities of the Republic of Croatia have conducted COVID-19 test in the team of HC Vardar 1961 on 31 August 2021, and have received a positive test for one team member. They have imposed the isolation for the positive-tested team member and people who were in contact with this team member, while for the rest of the team there is a possibility of a virus transmition. The Executive Committee made a decision that HC Vardar 1961 is excluded from the Final 4. Since HC PPD Zagreb was playing against HC Vardar 1961 in the quarter-finals of the competition, and due to the fact that they were the best ranked team of the regular part of the season, the Executive Committee also made a decision that HC PPD Zagreb will be invited to the Final 4 as a substitute team.

Bracket

References

External links
 Official Website

SEHA League
2020–21 domestic handball leagues
SEHA League
2020 in handball
2021 in handball
2020 in European sport
2021 in European sport